Miss Limousin is a French beauty pageant which selects a representative for the Miss France national competition from the region of Limousin. Women representing the region under various different titles have competed at Miss France since 1970, although the Miss Limousin title was not used regularly until 1986.

The current Miss Limousin is Salomé Maud, who was crowned Miss Limousin 2022 on 1 October 2022. No Miss Limousin titleholders have gone on to win Miss France.

Results summary
1st Runner-Up: Sophie Vouzelaud (2006)
2nd Runner-Up: Cécilia Perrier (1992)
3rd Runner-Up: Angélique Dusservaix (1975); Michèle Viravaud (1977)
4th Runner-Up: Aude Destour (2018)
Top 12/Top 15: Florence Bailet (1988); Priscilla Perrault (2000); Chloé Certoux (2008); Justine Posé (2009); Anaïs Berthomier (2017); Léa Graniou (2020)

Titleholders
From 1999 until 2005, the region competed under the name Miss Marche-Limousin. Prior to 1999 and after 2005, the region has competed as Miss Limousin.

Miss Corrèze
In 1977 and 1978, the department of Corrèze crowned its own representative for Miss France.

Miss Creuse
In 1976 and 1977, the department of Creuse crowned its own representative for Miss France.

Miss Haute-Vienne
In 1976 and 1977, the department of Haute-Vienne crowned its own representative for Miss France.

Notes

References

External links

Miss France regional pageants
Beauty pageants in France
Women in France